The Criminal is a 1953 novel by Jim Thompson.

Plot
Everyone in Kenton Hills knows that short-tempered, tongue-tied Bob Talbert wasn't the one responsible for the brutal crime that ended Josie Eddleman's life. Never mind that he was the last one to see her alive. 

But in a town filled with the likes of an amoral tabloid reporter known only as The Captain, a district attorney who'll do anything for a confession, and Bob's parents, who care as little for Bob as they do for each other, guilt and innocence are little more than a matter of perspective.

References

Novels by Jim Thompson
1953 American novels
American crime novels
Hardboiled crime novels